Abbasabad-e Arab (also Romanized as ‘Abbāsābād-e ‘Arab) is a village in Hokmabad Rural District, Atamalek District, Jowayin County, Razavi Khorasan Province, Iran. At the 2006 census, its population was 1,725, in 421 families.

See also 

 List of cities, towns and villages in Razavi Khorasan Province

References 

Populated places in Joveyn County